The Caterpillar D9 is a large track-type tractor designed and manufactured by Caterpillar Inc. It is usually sold as a bulldozer equipped with a detachable large blade and a rear ripper attachment.

The size, durability, reliability, and low operating costs have made the D9 one of the most popular large track-type tractors in the world.

Engineering and technical description
The D9 is a series of heavy tracked-type tractors, carried on continuous tracks and usually used as bulldozers. The series began in 1954 with a prototype tractor called the D9X. Ten D9X prototype models were built in 1954. In 1955, the  D9 was introduced to compete against the more powerful Euclid TC-12. The D9 came equipped with a 1,473 cid D353, which powered the D9 until the 1980 introduction of the D9L. The new  D9E replaced that model in 1959. Two years later, the legendary  D9G was introduced; it remained in production for 13 years; it became the main crawler on many job sites, testifying to its sturdiness and design.

In 1965, West Coast businessman Buster Peterson hooked up a pair of D9Gs to pushload the largest wheel tractor scrapers built. In 1968, Caterpillar bought the rights to this concept, thus the  DD9G was created (DD stands for Dual D9G). Peterson also built the first SxS D9G, which has two D9Gs side-by-side, pushing a -wide bulldozer blade.

In 1969, Caterpillar introduced this new SxS D9G. In 1974, the improved  D9H was introduced to replace the D9G. The D9H is still the most powerful conventional track-type tractor in company history. The DD9H and the SxS D9H soon followed.

In 1980, the  D9L was introduced. The unit featured the same new type of elevated drive sprocket undercarriage as had been introduced on the larger D10 in 1977. The new undercarriage design reduced strain and shock loads on the final drives and gave the "belly pan" more ground clearance. The elevated-drive-sprocket undercarriage is a modular design. To repair the machines, one breaks down the tracks and pulls the drive sprockets out. As a result, one can pull the powershift transmission out the rear. The  D9N replaced the D8L in 1987.

In 1988, Caterpillar produced their 25,000th elevated-drive-sprocket track-type tractor, a D9N. The  D9R replaced the D9N in 1996. The  D9T replaced the D9R in 2004. The D9T has a low-emissions ACERT diesel engine. The current model is the D9T; however, older models such as the D9R, D9N, and D9L are still commonly used. The L, N, R, and T models of the D9 are visually very similar, differing primarily in the design of their internal systems.

The D9L was replaced by the  D10N in 1987. The  D9N replaced D8L in 1987. The main difference between the D9T and the D9R is the installment of the new Cat C18 ACERT inline-six engine in the D9T vs the V8 3408 HEUI in the D9R. The D9R has clutch and brake steering, while the D9T has differential steering.

The D9's primary working tools are the blade, affixed to the front and controlled by four hydraulic cylinders, and an optional ripper, which can be attached to the back. The blade is mainly intended for earthmoving and bulk material handling: pushing up sand, soil, and rubble. It also can be used to push other heavy equipment such as earthmoving scraper pans, and in military applications, main battle tanks. The dozer blade usually has three variants:
 A straight blade ("S-blade") is short and has no lateral curve, with no side wings, and can be used for fine grading.
 A universal blade ("U-blade") is tall and very curved, and has large side wings to carry more material.
 A "S-U" combination blade is shorter, has less curvature, and has smaller side wings. This blade is typically used for pushing piles of large rocks, such as at a quarry.
Like many other bulldozers, the D9 can be fitted with other devices, such as mine plows.

The rear ripper is intended for use in loosening rocky ground and ripping out larger stones. It can also break frozen ground and excavate small ditches. The ripper can be replaced with a multishank ripper, allowing the bulldozer to comb the ground.

The size, power, and weight of the larger track-type tractors dictate that they are used primarily for major projects. The D9 is most commonly found in use in construction, forestry, mining, waste, and quarry operations.

Military applications

Caterpillar Inc. does not manufacture a military version of the D9 per se, but the attributes that make the D9 popular for major construction projects make it desirable for military applications, as well, and with Israeli modifications and armor, it has been particularly effective for the Israel Defense Forces and also used by KBR in Iraq.

The US Army used D9 bulldozers to clear forest in the Vietnam War, but after the war, they were replaced with smaller and cheaper Caterpillar D7G bulldozers. D7G bulldozers are still very common in US combat engineering battalions, but a series of oft-recurrent suggestions have been made to replace the lighter D7Gs with the newer and more heavily armored D9s.

The Caterpillar D9 have been used by the Israel Defense Forces (IDF) since it was introduced, but an armored model, with Israeli-developed vehicle armor kit, was introduced only in 1986, on the D9L. The IDF Caterpillar D9 armored bulldozer is operated by combat soldiers from the Combat Engineering Corps (Hebrew: חיל ההנדסה הקרבית) after going through a 2-month course. Many of the D9 operators are reservists and veterans, who operated heavy equipment also as civilians. The current models of the D9 employed by the IDF are the D9L, D9N, D9R, and D9T. Most of the IDF's D9 fleet today are composed of the D9R with slat armor. 

IDF D9 bulldozers were used during the Second Intifada (2000–2005) to demolish Palestinian structures and clear improvised explosive devices. The Israeli armor provides protection from small arms and explosives, and the bulldozers were used the Battle of Jenin 2002 during Operation Defensive Shield. A 2003 incident involving an IDF D9, in which a 23-year-old American activist was killed, resulted in a lawsuit brought against Caterpillar, Inc. in the United States. The court dismissed the case on grounds that it was outside their jurisdiction, and that Israeli tort law was a sufficient avenue to pursue remedies. Today, the D9 is one of the main combat engineering tools of the IDF and is considered a valuable asset.

See also
 Rome plow
 List of Caterpillar Inc. machines
 Killdozer! (film)

References

External links

Caterpillar D-Series Track-Type Tractors – Official Caterpillar website
Photoes of Caterpillar D9, Flickr
Army's new D9 bulldozer digs into duty in Kuwait – The US army tests the armoured D9R for the Iraqi campaign

Military engineering vehicles
Caterpillar Inc. vehicles
Tracked vehicles
Bulldozers
Tractors
Vehicles introduced in 1954